Alonso Cano Almansa or Alonzo Cano  (19 March 16013 September 1667)  was a Spanish painter, architect, and sculptor born in Granada.

Biography

He learned architecture from his father, Miguel Cano; painting in the academy of Juan del Castillo, and from Francisco Pacheco the teacher of Velázquez; and sculpture from Juan Martínez Montañés. As a sculptor, his most famous works are the Madonna and Child in the church of Lebrija (also called Nebrija), and the colossal figures of San Pedro and San Pablo.

He was made first royal architect, painter to Philip IV, and instructor to the prince, Balthasar Charles, Prince of Asturias. The King gave him the church preferment of a canon of the Granada Cathedral (1652), in order to take up a position as chief architect of the cathedral, where his main achievement in architecture was the façade, designed at the end of his life and erected to his design after his death.

He was notorious for his ungovernable temper; and it is said that once he risked his life by committing the then capital offence of dashing to pieces the statue of a saint, when in a rage with the purchaser who begrudged the price he demanded. According to another story, he found his house robbed after coming home one evening, his wife murdered, and his Italian servant fled. Notwithstanding the presumption against the fugitive, the magistrates condemned Cano, because he was of a jealous temper. Upon this he fled to Valencia, but afterwards returned to Madrid, where he was put to the torture, which he endured without incriminating himself, and the king received him into favour.

After the death of his wife he took Holy Orders as a protection from further prosecution, but still continued his professional pursuits. He died in 1667. In his last moments, when the priest held to him a crucifix, he told him to take it away because it was badly carved. According to the Catholic Encyclopedia, the dying Cano refused the Sacrament from a priest who gave it to conversos. Probably this version is spurious as many others about his life and temperament.

Works 
 San Vicente Ferrer (praying)
 Virgin of the Olive Tree (1629)
 Inmaculada del Facistol (1655–1656) in the sacristy of the Cathedral of Granada.
 Virgen of Bethlehem
 Bust of Saint Paul
 Head of San Juan de Dios
 Annunciation
 Christ Bound to the Column in the church of the Convento del Stmo. Cristo de la Victoria de Serradilla (Cáceres).
 Entrance of the Cathedral of Granada
 Saint John the Baptist as a Youth 1634, in the National Sculpture Museum (Valladolid).
 St. Anthony Preaching to the Fishes (ca. 1630) [The Detroit Institute of Arts]
 Christ and the Samaritan Woman(ca. 1650-1652) Real Academia de Bellas Artes de San Fernando Madrid.
 The Death of Saint Francis. Real Academia de Bellas Artes de San Fernando, Madrid.
 The Christ Crucified (c.1646) Real Academia de Bellas Artes de San Fernando.
Works by Cano in the Prado Museum in Madrid include:
 The Crucifixion
 Saint Anthony of Padua
 The Crucified Christ appears to Saint Teresa
 A king of Spain
 Two kings of Spain
 The Miracle of the Well
 Saint Bernard and the Virgin
 The Virgin and Child
 The Dead Christ supported by an Angel

Gallery

External links

 Paintings of Alonso Cano on Insecula
 Scholarly articles about Alonso Cano both in web and PDF @ the Spanish Old Masters Gallery
 Alonso Cano on Artcyclopedia
 Jusepe de Ribera, 1591-1652, a full text exhibition catalog from The Metropolitan Museum of Art, which includes material on Alonso Cano (see index)

References

1601 births
1667 deaths
People from Granada
17th-century Spanish architects
17th-century Spanish painters
Spanish male painters
Spanish Baroque sculptors
Spanish male sculptors
Spanish Roman Catholics
17th-century Spanish sculptors
Catholic sculptors
Catholic painters
Architects of Roman Catholic churches